Emily Santos (born 15 July 2005) is a Panamanian swimmer. She competed in the women's 100 metre breaststroke at the 2020 Summer Olympics.

References

External links
 

2005 births
Living people
Panamanian female swimmers
Olympic swimmers of Panama
Swimmers at the 2020 Summer Olympics
Place of birth missing (living people)
Pan American Games competitors for Panama
Swimmers at the 2019 Pan American Games
21st-century Panamanian women